Thierry Bourdin (born 30 October 1962) is a French wrestler. He competed at the 1984 Summer Olympics, the 1988 Summer Olympics and the 1992 Summer Olympics.

References

1962 births
Living people
French male sport wrestlers
Olympic wrestlers of France
Wrestlers at the 1984 Summer Olympics
Wrestlers at the 1988 Summer Olympics
Wrestlers at the 1992 Summer Olympics
Sportspeople from Clermont-Ferrand